Sophie Chang and Allie Kiick were the defending champions, but chose not to participate this year.

Francesca Di Lorenzo and Makenna Jones won the title, defeating Quinn Gleason and Elixane Lechemia in the final, 4–6, 6–3, [10–3].

Seeds

Draw

Draw

References

Main Draw

Vero Beach International - Doubles